Mouse Creek is a tributary of Schwaben Creek in Northumberland County, Pennsylvania, in the United States. The creek and its tributaries are not designated as impaired waterbodies. Its watershed is at least partially in the ridge and valley physiographic province. The main land use in the upper reaches of the creek's drainage basin are forested land and agricultural land, but other land uses exist as well. A number of bridges have been constructed across the creek.

Course
Mouse Creek begins in a valley in Jordan Township. It flows west-southwest for several tenths of a mile before turning west for a few tenths of a mile. It then turns west-northwest before turning west. After more than a mile, it turns north, receiving two unnamed tributaries from the left. The creek then passes through a water gap and enters Washington Township before entering another valley, where it receives an unnamed tributary from the right. The creek then turns west-southwest for a few tenths of a mile before turning west-northwest for several tenths of a mile and entering Washington Township. Here, it crosses Pennsylvania Route 225 and turns north, flowing through a much narrower valley alongside Pennsylvania Route 225 and receiving two unnamed tributaries (one from the left and one from the right). The creek then turns north-northeast for several tenths of a mile, crossing Pennsylvania Route 225 and reaching its confluence with Schwaben Creek.

Hydrology and climate
No stream segment in the watershed of Mouse Creek is designated as an impaired waterbody. The headwaters reach of the creek was selected as the reference watershed for the Dalmatia Creek total maximum daily load.

Numerous other metalloids and metals, such as alkali metals, alkaline earth metals, lanthanides, transition metals, and other metals have been observed in the creek

The peak annual discharge of the creek has a 10 percent chance of reaching  and a 2 percent chance of reaching . It has a 1 percent chance of reaching  and a 0.2 percent chance of reaching .

Geography, geology, and climate

At least part of the watershed of Mouse Creek is in the ridge and valley physiographic province. The surface geology in this part of the watershed consists mostly of a metamorphic rock known as schist, which does not have any significant effect on the sediment loads in the watershed.

A mountain known as Hooflander Mountain passes through the watershed of Mouse Creek, as does part of Fisher Ridge. A number of quarries of bluish-black limestone existed in the vicinity of the creek by the late 1800s.

Watershed
The mouth of the creek is in the United States Geological Survey quadrangle of Pillow. However, its source is in the quadrangle of Klingerstown. The mouth of the creek is located within  of Red Cross. The watershed is in the lower reaches of the Mahanoy Creek drainage basin.

Mouse Creek is one of the major streams in the watershed of Mahanoy Creek.

In the upper  of the watershed of Mouse Creek, the dominant land use is forested land, which makes up 52.0 percent of the land area. Agricultural land, including cropland and hay/pasture land, occupies 42.0 percent of this part of the watershed. Only 5.6 percent is low-intensity development, and only 0.3 percent is transitional land.

History
Mouse Creek was entered into the Geographic Names Information System on August 2, 1979. Its identifier in the Geographic Names Information System is 1181976.

Mouse Creek experienced flooding in June 1972, as did many other streams in the area.

Biology
Mouse Creek is designated as a Trout Stocked Fishery.

Mouse Creek has significant forested riparian buffers, especially in its headwaters. The ridgelines at the boundaries the watershed are also extensively forested. Contour cropping is practiced within the creek's watershed.

See also
Middle Creek (Schwaben Creek), next tributary of Schwaben Creek going upstream
List of rivers of Pennsylvania
List of tributaries of Mahanoy Creek

References

External links
USGS 404120076461601 Mouse Creek below Urban, PA

Rivers of Northumberland County, Pennsylvania
Tributaries of Mahanoy Creek
Rivers of Pennsylvania